Mister Peepers is an American sitcom that aired on NBC from July 3, 1952, to June 12, 1955.

Overview
Wally Cox starred as Robinson J. Peepers, Jefferson City's junior high school science teacher. Others in the cast included Tony Randall as history teacher Harvey Weskit; Georgiann Johnson as Harvey's wife, Marge; Patricia Benoit as school nurse Nancy Remington; Marion Lorne as oft-confused English teacher Mrs. Gurney; Jack Warden as athletic coach Frank Whip; and Ernest Truex and Sylvia Field as Nancy's parents.

The series began as a live summer replacement for Ford Festival, and was so popular that thousands wrote to NBC praising the series. When the Fall 1952 television season began, the filmed series Doc Corkle was so unpopular that additional scripts for Mr. Peepers were quickly written, and that series replaced Doc Corkle in October.

The series often involved Peepers coping with misbehaving inanimate objects or embarrassing moments. In a typical scene, Peepers sees a hopscotch grid chalked on a sidewalk, and thinking himself alone, plays the game with abandon, only to discover that his girlfriend Nancy has been silently watching the entire time.

The principal's dithering wife, Mrs. Gurney, played by Marion Lorne, is kind and gracious, but absentminded.  In one episode, Peepers injures his finger with a hammer, and Mrs. Gurney solicitously bandages his finger to at least five times its actual size.  After Mrs. Gurney leaves the room, Peepers tells Nancy that the wrong finger had been bandaged.

Tony Randall played history teacher Harvey Weskit.  Popular and confident Weskit becomes the best friend of timid, bespectacled Peepers. In one episode, Weskit points out a packet of unopened love letters that women have sent him, complaining that he is always getting them.  He begins to look inside Peepers' locker to see the stack of similar letters he expects to find there, and Peepers quickly closes the locker door, commenting that he has to keep the door closed so that they will not all fall out.

Patricia Benoit, as Nancy Remington, is Peepers' love interest, although for a time, she seems unaware of his attraction to her.  By February 1954, though, the couple's romance had progressed to the point of Mr. Peepers presenting Nancy with a photograph of himself, inscribed "Scientifically yours, Robinson". Peepers proposed on the April 18th episode, and the couple wed on the May 30, 1954, show. The marriage episode was one of the  major television events of 1954. The American TV magazine TV Guide used the picture of the couple's television wedding on its cover page.

Mister Peepers was aired live, on stage before an audience at the New Century Theatre, 932 7th Avenue, New York City—preserved in the form of 16 mm kinescopes.

Wally Cox was somewhat typecast by the role of the mild-mannered Peepers, but continued on to a long career in films and television.  He later starred in a comedy/adventure series, The Adventures of Hiram Holliday, and is remembered as the voice of the cartoon superhero Underdog. He is best remembered by game-show fans as a regular panelist on The Hollywood Squares from 1966 until his death in 1973.  He also wrote and published a novel, Mr. Peepers (1955), based on scripts from the televised adventures of the character.

Production 
David Swift created the show and wrote for it, along with Jim Fritzell. Fred Coe was the producer, and Hal Keith was the director. Bernie Green was the music director.

Episode status
Reportedly 102 of the 127 episode Kinescopes of Mister Peepers survive.  RetroTV aired episodes of the show on Wednesday mornings, but as of 2021, no longer does.

DVD release
In 2005, the first 26 episodes of Mister Peepers, which had been preserved by the UCLA Film and Television Archive, were released on DVD by S'more Entertainment. In November 2008, the second boxed set of Mister Peepers was released by S'more Entertainment. The tagline at the bottom of the box reads: "America's Favorite Science Teacher, Underdog and All-Round Nice Guy." The Underdog comment coyly references Cox's later role as the voice of the title character in the Underdog cartoon.

Mister Peepers began as a summer replacement series in 1952. The first DVD set, titled Mr. Peepers, contains the summer episodes, as well as those from October 1952 to March 1953 episodes of the first full season. The Mister Peepers - Season 2" DVD sets picks up where the first set left off, containing episodes from the remainder of the first season and part of the second season, from March 1953 to November 1953.

Awards and nominations

References

External links

1952 American television series debuts
1955 American television series endings
1950s American high school television series
1950s American sitcoms
American workplace comedy television series
Black-and-white American television shows
English-language television shows
Peepers, Robinson J.
NBC original programming
Peabody Award-winning television programs
Television series about educators